Computer magazines are about computers and related subjects, such as networking and the Internet. Most computer magazines offer (or offered) advice, some offer programming tutorials, reviews of the latest technologies, and advertisements.

History

1940s–1950s
Mathematics of Computation established in 1943, articles about computers began to appear from 1946 (Volume 2, Number 15) to the end of 1954. Scientific journal.
Digital Computer Newsletter, (1949–1968), founded by Albert Eugene Smith.
Computers and Automation, (1951–1978), was arguably the first computer magazine. It began as Roster of Organizations in the Computing Machinery Field (1951–1952), and then The Computing Machinery Field (1952–1953). It was published by Edmund Berkeley. Computers and Automation held the first Computer Art Contest circa 1963 and maintained a  bibliography on computer art starting in 1966. It also included a monthly estimated census of all installed computer systems starting in 1962.
IEEE Transactions on Computers from 1952, scientific journal.
Computing News (1953-1962?), was an early computer magazine produced by Jackson W. Granholm out of Thousand Oaks, California. The first documented copyright was applied for on September 1, 1954, for issue #36. The magazine was released on the 1st and 15th of each month, which places issue #1 at March 15, 1953. The last documented release was issue #217 on March 15, 1962.
Journal of the ACM from 1954, scientific journal.
Datamation from 1957, was another early computer and data processing magazine. It is still being published as an ePublication on the Internet. Futurist Donald Prell was its founder. 
Information and Computation from 1957, scientific journal.
IBM Journal of Research and Development from 1957, scientific journal.
Communications of the ACM from 1958, mix of science magazine, trade magazine, and a scientific journal
The Computer Journal from 1958, scientific journal.

1960s–1970s
ACS Newsletter (1966–1976), Amateur Computer Society newsletter.
 Computerworld (1967)
 People's Computer Company Newsletter (1972–1981)
 Amateur Computer Club Newsletter (ACCN; 1973–)
 Dr. Dobb's Journal (1976–2014) was the first microcomputer magazine to focus on software, rather than hardware.

1980s 

1980s computer magazines skewed their content towards the hobbyist end of the then-microcomputer market, and used to contain type-in programs, but these have gone out of fashion. The first magazine devoted to this class of computers was Creative Computing. Byte was an influential technical journal that published until the 1990s.

In 1983 an average of one new computer magazine appeared each week. By late that year more than 200 existed. Their numbers and size grew rapidly with the industry they covered, and BYTE and 80 Micro were among the three thickest magazines of any kind per issue. Compute!s editor in chief reported in the December 1983 issue that "all of our previous records are being broken: largest number of pages, largest-number of four-color advertising pages, largest number of printing pages, and the largest number of editorial pages".

Computers were the only industry with product-specific magazines, like 80 Micro, PC Magazine, and Macworld; their editors vowed to impartially cover their computers whether or not doing so hurt their readers' and advertisers' market, while claiming that their rivals pandered to advertisers by only publishing positive news. BYTE in March 1984 apologized for publishing articles by authors with promotional material for companies without describing them as such, and in April suggested that other magazines adopt its rules of conduct for writers, such as prohibiting employees from accepting gifts or discounts. InfoWorld stated in June that many of the "150 or so" industry magazines published articles without clearly identifying authors' affiliations and conflicts of interest.

Many magazines ended that year, however, as their number exceeded the amount of available advertising revenue despite revenue in the first half of the year five times that of the same period in 1982. Consumers typically bought computer magazines more for advertising than articles, which benefited already leading journals like BYTE and PC Magazine and hurt weaker ones. Also affecting magazines was the computer industry's economic difficulties, including the video game crash of 1983, which badly hurt the home-computer market. Dan Gutman, the founder of Computer Games, recalled in 1987 that "the computer games industry crashed and burned like a bad night of Flight Simulator—with my magazine on the runway". Antics advertising sales declined by 50% in 90 days, Compute! number of pages declined from 392 in December 1983 to 160 ten months later, and Compute! and Compute!'s Gazettes publisher assured readers in an editorial that his company "is and continues to be quite successful ... even during these particularly difficult times in the industry". Computer Gaming World stated in 1988 that it was the only one of the 18 color magazines that covered computer games in 1983 to survive the crash. Compute! similarly stated that year that it was the only general-interest survivor of about 150 consumer-computing magazines published in 1983.

Some computer magazines in the 1980s and 1990s were issued only on disk (or cassette tape, or CD-ROM) with no printed counterpart; such publications are collectively (though somewhat inaccurately) known as disk magazines and are listed separately.

1990s 
In some ways the heyday of printed computer magazines was a period during the 1990s, in which a large number of computer manufacturers took out advertisements in computer magazines, so they became quite thick and could afford to carry quite a number of articles in each issue, (Computer Shopper was a good example of this trend). Some printed computer magazines used to include covermount floppy disks, CDs, or other media as inserts; they typically contained software, demos, and electronic versions of the print issue.

2000s–2010s 
However, with the rise in popularity of the Internet, many computer magazines went bankrupt or transitioned to an online-only existence. Exceptions include Wired, which is more of a technology magazine than a computer magazine.

List of computer magazines

Notable regular contributors to print computer magazines

See also
 Online magazine
 Magazine
 Online newspaper

References 

 
Magazine
Magazine genres